The 2008 World Sambo Championships was held in St. Petersburg, Russia on 13 to 17 of November, 2008.
This tournament included competition in both sport Sambo, and Combat Sambo.

Categories 
 Combat Sambo: 52 kg, 57 kg, 62 kg, 68 kg, 74 kg, 82 kg, 90 kg, 100 kg, +100 kg
 Men's Sambo: 52 kg, 57 kg, 62 kg, 68 kg, 74 kg, 82 kg, 90 kg, 100 kg, +100 kg
 Women's Sambo: 48 kg, 52 kg, 56 kg, 60 kg, 64 kg, 68 kg, 72 kg, 80 kg, +80 kg

Medal overview

Combat Sambo events

Men's Sambo events

Women's events

Medal table

External links 
 
 

World Sambo Championships
World Sambo Championships
Sports competitions in Saint Petersburg
World Sambo Championships
World Sambo Championships
November 2008 sports events in Europe